Pyrorchis forrestii, commonly known as pink beaks, is a species of orchid endemic to Western Australia. It has two or three ground-hugging leaves and up to seven sweetly perfumed, pink and white flowers, but it only flowers after fire the previous summer.

Description
Pyrorchis forrestii is a terrestrial, perennial, deciduous, herb with an underground tuber and two or three ground-hugging, egg-shaped, light green leaves. The lateral sepals are similar to the dorsal sepal but narrower and turn downwards and away from each other. The petals are a similar size and shape to the lateral sepals. It is white with red lines and has fine teeth on its edges. Flowering occurs from October to December but only after fire the previous summer.

Taxonomy and naming
Pink beaks was first formally described in 1810 by Ferdinand von Mueller who gave it the name Lyperanthus forrestii and published the description in Fragmenta phytographiae Australiae. In 1994 David Jones & Mark Clements changed the name to Pyrorchis forrestii. The specific epithet (forrestii) honours John Forrest, the first Premier of Western Australia.

Distribution and habitat
Pyrorchis forrestii grows in winter-wet flat areas between Augusta and Albany in the Jarrah Forest and Warren biogeographic regions.

Conservation
Pyrorchis forrestii is classified as "not threatened" by the Western Australian Government Department of Parks and Wildlife.

References

forrestii
Orchids of Western Australia
Plants described in 1882
Endemic flora of Western Australia
Taxa named by Ferdinand von Mueller